Albert Theodor Otto Emmich (since 1913 von Emmich) (4 August 1848 – 22 December 1915) was a Prussian general.

Biography
Emmich was the son of an Oberst (Colonel). He married Elise Pauline Sophie (born 1855), daughter of Karl von Graberg. Born in Minden, Emmich entered the Prussian Army in 1866. A veteran of the Franco-Prussian War, he was promoted to major-general in 1901 and given command of the 31st Infantry brigade. In 1905, he was promoted to lieutenant-general and given command of the 10th Division. He attained the rank of general of infantry in 1909, and was placed in command of the X Army Corps at Hanover. 

During the early days of World War I in Europe in 1914, he was given command of a provisional army, Army of the Meuse, which was explicitly formed for the special task of taking the forts of Liège and securing the invasion roads into Belgium for the regular German armies.

The Battle of Liège began shortly after the morning of 5 August 1914, when German bombardment began on the eastern Belgian forts. That marks it chronologically as the first battle to take place during World War I, beginning shortly before the Battle of Mulhouse. The Imperial German troops were obliged to entrench and bring up heavy siege artillery. He laid siege to Liège, which he entered on 7 August 1914, but the last forts did not surrender until 16 August 1914.

After the fall of Liège, Emmich reverted to corps command and fought at the Marne and in the trench warfare near Reims. In April 1915 Emmich was transferred to the Eastern front where he fought in the Gorlice–Tarnów Offensive.

Emmich was ennobled in 1913. He died of arteriosclerosis in Hanover.

Awards and decorations
 Grand Cross of the Order of the Red Eagle
 Order of the Crown, 1st class (Prussia)
 Iron Cross of 1870, 2nd class
 Pour le Mérite (7 August 1914) together with Erich Ludendorff for the taking of Liège; Oak Leaves added to the Pour le Mérite on 14 May 1915

Footnotes

References

 The Siege of Liège: A Personal Narrative, by Paul Hamelius (London, 1914).
 
 In Daily Chronicle War Books, Volume IV, (1914), "The Campaign Around Liège" by J. M. Kennedy.
 The Guns of August by Barbara Tuchman (1962)

External links
 

1848 births
1915 deaths
People from Minden
People from the Province of Westphalia
Generals of Infantry (Prussia)
German untitled nobility
German military personnel of the Franco-Prussian War
German Army generals of World War I
Recipients of the Pour le Mérite (military class)
Recipients of the Iron Cross (1870), 2nd class
Deaths from arteriosclerosis
Military personnel from North Rhine-Westphalia